Otello Trombetta (October 13, 1915 – unknown) was an Italian professional football player.

He played four games, scoring one goal in the Serie A 1935–36 season for A.S. Roma.

References

External links 

 His profile of score 

1915 births
Year of death missing
Italian footballers
Serie A players
A.S. Roma players
L'Aquila Calcio 1927 players
Association football forwards